Eupithecia phaea is a moth in the family Geometridae. It is found in Mongolia.

The wingspan is about 19 mm. The fore and hindwings are pale whitish grey.

References

Moths described in 2008
phaea
Moths of Asia